1970–71 was the 24th season of the Western International Hockey League.

Standings
 Spokane Jets		        52		39	11	 2				267	147		 80
 Kimberley Dynamiters	        52		27	22	 3				205	200		 55
 Nelson Maple Leafs		52		24	27	 1				236	237		 49
 Cranbrook Royals		52		18	30	 4				185	220		 40
 Trail Smoke Eaters		52		18	31	 3				156	220		 39

Playoff
In the Best of 7 semi-finals:
 Nelson defeated Kimberley 4 games to 1(3-4, 3-2 OT, 6-4, 5-3, 2-0)
 Spokane defeated Cranbrook 4 games to 2 (10-3, 3-4, 9-1, 3-4, 7-5, 3-2 OT)

In the Best of 7 final series, the Nelson Maple Leafs defeated the Spokane Jets 4 games to 2 (9-4, 3-4, 3-6, 4-2, 4-3, 5-2). The Nelson Maple Leafs advanced to the 1970-71 Western Canada Allan Cup Playoffs.

References 

Western International Hockey League seasons
Wihl
Wihl